Maharashtra State Highway No. 190, commonly referred to as MH SH 190, is a normal short length state highway that runs from Malkapur in Buldhana District to Nasirabad in Jalgaon District. The total length of the Highway is 65 km.

Summary 

This Highway is  one of the important road for Buldhana District & Jalgaon District. The highway starts from Malkapur with junction of MH SH 176, it passes through Bodwad City and Kurhe Town and ends at Nasirabad with Junction of NH-6.
It is also a parallel option for Bypassing the heavy traffic of NH-6 also helpful in saving some kilometers instead of traveling through National Highway 6 (India)(old numbering).

See also 
 List of State Highways in Maharashtra

State Highways in Maharashtra
State Highways in Nagpur District